
Year 414 (CDXIV) was a common year starting on Thursday (link will display the full calendar) of the Julian calendar. At the time, it was known as the Year of the Consulship of Constantius and Constans (or, less frequently, year 1167 Ab urbe condita). The denomination 414 for this year has been used since the early medieval period, when the Anno Domini calendar era became the prevalent method in Europe for naming years

Events 
 By place 
 Roman Empire 
 January 1 – Galla Placidia, half-sister of emperor Honorius, is married to the Visigothic king Ataulf at Narbonne. The wedding is celebrated with Roman festivities and magnificent gifts from the Gothic booty.
 July 4 – Emperor Theodosius II, age 13, yields power to his older sister Aelia Pulcheria, who reigns as regent and proclaims herself empress (Augusta) of the Eastern Roman Empire.
 Constantius III, Roman general (magister militum), begins a military campaign against the Visigoths in Gaul. He blockades the Gallic ports and besieges Marseille.
 Priscus Attalus is proclaimed rival emperor by the Visigoths for a second time at Bordeaux, in order to impose their terms on Honorius, who has his residence in Ravenna.

 Asia 
 The Southern Liang, a state of the Sixteen Kingdoms during the Jin Dynasty, comes to an end.

 By topic 
 Religion 
 Fa-Hien, Chinese Buddhist monk, returns from India and begins translating Buddhist works into Chinese.
 Abdas, bishop of Susa, burns down a Zoroastrian temple; in retaliation, King Yazdegerd I of Persia orders the destruction of churches.

Births

Deaths 
 Synesius, bishop of Ptolemais (approximate date)
 Yujiulü Hulü, ruler of the Rouran Khaganate (Mongolia)

References